WSBK may refer to:

 WSBK-TV, a television station (channel 21, virtual 38) licensed to Boston, Massachusetts, United States
 Superbike World Championship